The Moderate Youth League (MUF), officially known in  English as the Swedish Young Conservatives, is the youth wing of the Swedish Moderate Party. Of the political youth organizations that received financial support from the Swedish National Board for Youth Affairs in 2009, it had the highest number of members.

The Moderate Youth League is more libertarian-leaning and more radical than the mother party. It is generally pro-market, pro-American, pro-Israeli and liberal in social issues such as abortion, gay rights and supports legalization of illegal file sharing and alcohol manufacturing for private, nonprofit purposes. Its official ideologies are liberalism and conservatism.

History 
The Moderate Youth League was formed in 1934 as the Young Swedes (Swedish: Ungsvenskarna) as a consequence of the split between the Moderate Party (then the General Electoral Union) and its youth organization, the National Youth League of Sweden (Swedish: Sveriges nationella ungdomsförbund) which had turned into an openly pro-Nazi organization. In 1946 the organization changed its name to the Youth Association of the Right (Swedish: Högerns ungdomsförbund). The current name was adopted in 1969.

Organization 
The Moderate Youth League is led by a national executive committee, elected every two years at the national congress. The President is supported by two vice-chairmen. Normally, members of the national executive have served at district level first. The current chairman, for example, used to be chairman of the Stockholm district. The national chairman also sits on the national board of the Moderate Party.

Districts follow county borders. The largest one is Stockholm, followed by Skåne. They maintain a rivalry, sometimes staging competitions on who can recruit the most members. Other large districts include Uppsala and Östergötland.

Young Conservative Moderates 
The Young Conservative Moderates (Unga konservativa moderater) are an internal faction of the Moderate Youth League. It was founded in 2004 as Mörkblått värn (literally Dark-Blue Defence), but changed to its current name after the founder left to join the Christian Democrats. Young Conservative Moderates seek to promote a conservative alternative to the current dominance of liberalism within the organisation. The organisation compromises both traditionalists and neoconservatives.

Moderate School Youth 
The Moderate School Youth (Moderat skolungdom, MSU) is a part of the organisation and includes all MUF members between 12 and 20 years of age.

At the annual conference, a national executive is elected. They are not decision-makers but more of an elite campaigning team which travel around Sweden. The national chairman has a place on the national executive of the Youth League. The current chairman, since 2020, is Rebecca Nordin Vainio.

Moderate Students 
not to be confused with the Free Moderate Students

In 2008, the Moderate Students was founded as a student network within the Moderate Youth League and it has since then grown to become the largest student political organization in Sweden. It is the official student organization of the Moderate Youth League, the youth wing of the Swedish Moderate Party. It is not to be confused with the Free Moderate Students, founded in the 1940s and still active as an independent student wing of the Moderate Party.

Organization
Moderate Students is a national organization consisting of student associations on various universities and campuses in Sweden. Individual membership is sorted by district. Moderate Students originally existed as a party in the student union at Lund University, before the union was dissolved in 1998. Today, the Moderate Students exist as parties at other universities, such as Uppsala University and Umeå University.

Politics
Moderate Students focuses primarily on students' economical situations. They have advocated for an extended "work-tax reduction" for young people and for removing taxes on work and studies in general. They specifically want to repeal the tax on students who take out a student loan and work in addition to their studies. They have also become involved in discussions about the availability of student housing.

National board members
The 2009 Moderate Students national board consisted of chairman Caroline Garsbo, first vice chairman Jonas Grafström, second vice chairman Anna Alriksson, Erik Persson, Pirita Isegran, and Cecilia Hellgren.

The 2010 board was led by chairman Erik Persson and first vice chairman Michael Wigg. Additional members included Lars Hindrum, Ida Drougge, Evelina Kogsta, and Péteris Timofejevs Henriksson.

The 2011 board was led by chairman Ida Drougge, first vice chairman Andrea Ström, and second vice chairman Alexandra Westman. Additional members included Evelina Kogsta, Erik Raita, Simon Vallin, and Petter Krönmark.

The 2012 board was chaired by Andrea Ström, with Filip Solsjö and Olivia Andersson serving as first and second vice chairmen, respectively. Additional members included Jeanette Widén, Erik Gestrinius, Therese Lindström, and Clara Enocson.

The 2014 board, was chaired by Benjamin Dousa, with Armend Dushica and Annie Widerberg serving as first and second vice chairmen, respectively. Additional members included Caroline Jarbratt, Mikael Persson, Jesper Skalberg Karlsson and Denice Sigvardsson.

The 2015 board, was chaired by Benjamin Dousa, with Sofia Axelsson and John Eklöf serving as first and second vice chairmen, respectively. Additional members included Jonas Jesslén, Ina Djureståhl, Sara Elingfors and Denice Sigvardsson.

The 2016 board, was chaired by Ina Djurestål, with Klas Vestergren and Sofia Lindbom serving as first and second vice chairmen, respectively. Additional members included Jonas Jesslén, Sofia Andersson, Sara Persson and Lucas Kramer.

The 2017 board, was chaired by Ina Djurestål, with Sofia Andersson and Greta Eulau serving as first and second vice chairmen, respectively. Additional members include Baran Calisir, Sarah Ullmark, Clara Albinsson and John Backvid.

The 2018 board, was chaired by Greta Eulau, with Kristoffer Sundström and Roosa Porthén serving as first and second vice chairmen, respectively. Additional members include Karl Opdal, Pasi Huikuri, Jakob Sommerin Nilsson and Christopher Rydaeus.

The current board, as of 2019, is chaired by Greta Eulau, with Lucas Ljungberg and Viktor Hedqvist serving as first and second vice chairmen, respectively. Additional members include Niklas Törnå, Ludvig Berggren, Madelene Nord and Linus Lindeblom.

Chapters
The following Swedish universities have chapters of Moderate Students.

Blekinge Institute of Technology
Dalarna University College
Gävle University College
Gotland University College
Halmstad University
Jönköping University Foundation
Karlstad University
Kristianstad University College
Linköping University
Linnaeus University
Luleå University of Technology
Lund University
Mälardalen University College
Mid Sweden University
Örebro University
Royal Institute of Technology
University of Skövde
Södertörn University
Stockholm School of Economics
Stockholm University
Umeå University
University of Borås
University of Gothenburg
Uppsala University

Current and former members 
Under many years the Moderate Party did not have any official student organisation. The Confederation of Swedish Conservative and Liberal Students (Fria moderata studentförbundet, FMSF) was dislodged from the party because of its radical neoliberalism. Therefore, many students join the Youth League instead. This results in the age of members spanning the whole age-spectrum from roughly 15 to 30. There is, however, widespread cross-membership between the youth and student leagues. In Uppsala, a traditional student town, the radicalism of the Student League has also spread to the local MUF district due to almost all local leaders also being active in the Confederation of Swedish Conservative and Liberal Students.

Naturally many current politicians of the Moderate Party, started their careers in the Youth League. The most famous being the current leader of the party, Fredrik Reinfeldt, who is a former chairman. The last chairman, Christofer Fjellner, was elected to the European Parliament before resigning from his Youth League position. The Moderate Youth League played a great part in this, lobbying for him inside the party and campaigning for him in the election. In 2002, Tove Lifvendahl became the first Youth League chairman to be elected to the national board of the party directly after resigning from the Moderate Youth League. Many former leaders left politics but gained prominence in other spheres of society, most of all in business.

The Moderate Youth League has around 9,500 members (2004/2005).

Ideology 
The Moderate Youth League defines its ideology in four statements. Apart from these, the Youth League publishes no manifestos or political programmes of any sort. These are:

 For the freedom of the individual. Against political oppression and coercion.
 For every human's responsibility for his/her own future. Against paternalism and the nanny state (förmynderi och politisk klåfingrighet).
 For diversity and respect for differences. Against intolerance and conformity.
 For a free market and a world without borders. Against walls and regulations.

The modern Moderate Youth League are staunch supporters of capitalism, deregulation and lower taxes. They also adhere to individualism, which extends to wide-reaching support for gay rights. The League supports free trade, free immigration and wants to abolish foreign aid.

Like its opponents in the Swedish Social Democratic Youth League, the Moderate Youth League has suffered from divisions between different factions. The 1990s saw many battles between modernising neoliberals and conservatives. At the congress in Lycksele in 1992, Fredrik Reinfeldt, the former leader between 25 October 2003 – 10 January 2015 of Moderate Party, was elected chairman, defeating the neoliberal Ulf Kristersson. In recent years, however, the division have largely disappeared. With the Moderates becoming more cosmopolitan, the traditionalist Conservatives have all but disappeared. Gay rights were a source of division, but now almost all of the Moderate Youth League supports equal rights of marriage and adoption for homosexuals. A conservative fringe group, however, was formed – Young Conservative Moderates (Unga konservativa moderater) – but did not gain widespread membership.

In foreign policy, MUF tends to support the United States, including the 2003 Iraq War and Swedish NATO membership. Chairwoman Tove Lifvendahl proudly wore an "I love Bush" shirt after George W. Bush's election in 2000, although she was quick to criticise him for the steel tariffs he later imposed. It is also strongly supportive of Israel. Though generally supportive of the European Union, the Youth League does not support Sweden adopting the euro.

Chairpersons

References

External links
Moderata Ungdomsförbundet (in Swedish)

Youth wings of political parties in Sweden
Moderate Party
International Young Democrat Union
Youth organizations established in 1934
1934 establishments in Sweden